In various parliamentary systems, a returning officer is responsible for overseeing elections in one or more constituencies.

Australia
In Australia a returning officer is an employee of the Australian Electoral Commission or a state electoral commission who heads the local divisional office full-time, and oversees elections in their division, or an employee of a private firm which carries out elections and/or ballots in the private and/or public sectors, or anyone who carries out any election and/or ballot for any group or groups.

Canada
In Canada, at the federal level, the returning officer of an electoral district is appointed for a ten-year term by the Chief Electoral Officer. The returning officer is responsible for handling the electoral process in the riding, and updating the National Register of Electors with current information about voters in the electoral district to which they are appointed. Before enactment of the Canada Elections Act in 2000, in the case of a tie between the two leading candidates in an election, the returning officer would cast the deciding vote.  Since 2000, a tie between two leading candidates automatically results in a by-election.

The provinces and territories of Canada each have their own returning officers.

Germany
Germany has a Federal Returning Officer and a returning officer in each state.

Hong Kong
In Hong Kong, the returning officer is usually an administrative officer  of the government.

India
The returning officer of a parliamentary or assembly constituency is responsible for the conduct of elections in the parliamentary or assembly constituency concerned as per the Representation of the People Act, 1951. Returning officer is the head of elections in a particular constituency. Generally, in the case of Lok Sabha elections, it is the District Magistrate and in the case of state assembly elections, it is the Sub-Divisional Magistrate who is ex-officio returning officer. Returning officer is the statutory authority to conduct the polling, counting process and to decide validity of ballot paper and election commission has no power to overrule him or her.

The Election Commission of India nominates or designates an officer of the government or a local authority as the returning officer for each of the assembly and parliamentary constituencies in consultation with the state government/union territory administration. In addition, the Election Commission of India also appoints one or more assistant returning officers for each of the assembly and parliamentary constituencies to assist the returning officer in the performance of his functions in connection with the conduct of elections.

Ireland
In the Republic of Ireland, the post of returning officer in Dublin  and Cork is held by the city sheriff, and in the other areas by the county registrar of the area (a senior court official). For local elections, the position is held by the administrative head of the local council. The returning officer for presidential elections and referendums is a senior official in the franchise section of the Department of the Environment.

New Zealand
In New Zealand, the returning officer is in charge of overseeing the voting process in each electorate.

Singapore
The Returning Officer (RO) is in charge of overseeing the conduct of parliamentary (by-elections and general elections) and presidential elections. The Returning Officer declares results for the parliamentary general elections and the presidential elections in the following manner:

For single member constituencies (SMCs):
(Before 2015) Parliamentary general election year. Results for the electoral division of name of seat. Name of first candidate, party of first candidate, number of votes. Name of following candidate, party of following candidate, number of votes. Rejected votes, number of rejected votes. Total votes cast, number of total votes including rejected votes. The local votes counted for the electoral division of seat name are conclusive of the results. Pursuant to Section 49, Subsection 7E, Paragraph A of the Parliamentary Elections Act, I declare name of winning candidate of the party name as the candidate elected for the electoral division of seat name.

(After 2015) Results for name of seat. Name of first candidate, party of first candidate, number of votes. Name of following candidate, party of following candidate, number of votes. Total votes cast for the candidates, number of total votes excluding rejected votes. Rejected votes, number of rejected votes. The votes cast in Singapore counted for seat name are conclusive of the results. I declare name of winning candidate of the party name as the candidate elected for seat name.

For group representation constituencies (GRCs):

(Before 2015) Parliamentary general election year. Results for the electoral division of name of seat. Names of candidates in first group, party of first group, number of votes. Names of following candidates in following group, party of following group, number of votes. Rejected votes, number of rejected votes. Total votes cast, number of total votes including rejected votes. The local votes counted for the electoral division of seat name are conclusive of the results. Pursuant to Section 49, Subsection 7E, Paragraph A of the Parliamentary Elections Act, I declare names of winning group of candidates of the party of group of candidates as the group of candidates elected for the electoral division of seat name.

(After 2015) Results for name of seat. Names of candidates in first group, party of first group, number of votes. Names of following candidates in following group, party of following group, number of votes.  Total votes cast for the candidates, number of total votes excluding rejected votes. Rejected votes, number of rejected votes. The votes cast in Singapore counted for seat name are conclusive of the results. I declare names of winning group of candidates of the party of group of candidates as the group of candidates elected for seat name.

For presidential elections:

 Result for the presidential election year. Name of first candidate, number of votes. Name of following candidate, number of votes. Rejected votes, number of rejected votes. Total votes cast, number of total votes. The local votes counted are conclusive of the results. Pursuant to Section 32, Subsection 8D, Paragraph A of the Presidential Elections Act, I declare name of winning candidate as the candidate elected as the President of Singapore.

For SMCs with a walkover:

 Parliamentary general election year. Announcement of result on nomination day, the electoral division of name of seat. Name of candidate, party of candidate, is the only candidate nominated for the electoral division of name of seat. Under Section 33 of the Parliamentary Elections Act,  I declare name of candidate of the party of candidate as the candidate elected for the electoral division of seat name.

For GRCs with a walkover:

 Parliamentary general election year. Announcement of result on nomination day, the electoral division of name of seat. Name of candidates in party of first group, party of first group, is the only group of candidates nominated for the electoral division of name of seat. Under Section 33 of the Parliamentary Elections Act,  I declare name of winning group of candidates of the party of group of candidates as the group of candidates elected for the electoral division of seat name.

Section 49, Subsection 7E, Paragraph A of the Parliamentary Elections Act [or Section 32, Subsection 8D, Paragraph A of the Presidential Elections Act], are stated, only if the total number of overseas electors lawfully entitled to vote at the election in that electoral division is less than the difference between the number of votes given to the two best-performing candidates or group of candidates. In the event where the total of overseas voters is more than the difference between the number of votes given to the two best-performing candidates, the RO may declare the number of votes cast in Singapore for the candidates, and announce the date and premises for the counting of overseas votes, in accordance with Section 49, Subsection 7E, Paragraph B of the Parliamentary Elections Act [or Section 32, Subsection 8D, Paragraph B of the Presidential Elections Act]. The RO's duties also encompasses announcing the best-performing losing candidates as non-constituency Members of Parliament (NCMPs) post-elections in the government gazette.

List of returning officers

Sri Lanka
In Sri Lanka, returning officers are appointed by the Commissioner of Elections under the Registration of Electors Act, No. 44 of 1980 for all presidential, general (parliamentary), provincial and local government elections held in the island. Normally public officers are appointed as returning officers and they may appoint assistant returning officers to assist them.

In the Parliament of Sri Lanka, the Secretary-General acts as the returning officer for votes conducted within the Parliament.

United Kingdom

General elections
In England and Wales the post of returning officer for general elections is an honorary one, held by the high sheriff of the county for a county constituency or the mayor or chairman of the local council for a borough constituency. If a constituency overlaps district and county borders, the returning officer is designated by the Secretary of State for Justice.

In practice, the task of conducting the election is delegated to an acting returning officer, who is usually a senior officer in the local authority (the only duties which can be reserved and undertaken by the returning officer are related to the receipt of the writ and the declaration of the result, and only if written notice is given by the returning officer to the acting returning officer). In an English or Welsh constituency where the returning officer is the chairman of the local district council or the mayor if a borough council, the electoral registration officer is automatically the acting returning officer. In an English or Welsh constituency where the high sheriff or mayor is returning officer, the acting returning officer is designated by the Secretary of State for Justice.

In Scotland, there is no office of acting returning officer and the position of returning officer is not an honorary one. The returning officer for general elections is the same person who has been appointed returning officer for the election of councillors in the local authority in which the constituency is situated. If a constituency covers more than one local authority area, the Secretary of State for Justice designates which local authority returning officer will discharge the function.

In Northern Ireland, the Chief Electoral Officer acts as the returning officer.

Returning officers normally announce the results after the count in the following manner:

Recall petitions 

The returning officer for a constituency additionally acts as the petitions officer for recall petitions.

Local elections
In England and Wales, every district council or unitary authority is required to appoint an officer of the council to be the returning officer for the election of councillors to their local authority, and any parish councils in their area. County councils must also appoint a returning officer for the election of councillors within the county.

References

See also
 Election official
 Chief Electoral Officer (Canada)
 Chief Electoral Officer of Quebec
 Secretary of state (U.S. state government)

Elections